13th ZAI Awards

Presenter(s)  Union of Authors and Performers  Hudba.sk 

Producer National Public Center 

Hall of Fame Vladimír Juhanesovič

◄ 12th

The 13th ZAI Awards, honoring the best in the Slovak music industry for individual achievements for the year of 2013, took place on February 13, 2014 at the V-klub music club in Bratislava. The annual ceremony held in association of the National Public Center (NOC), was hosted by Martin Sarvaš, the chairman of the ZAI union.

Prior to the final nominations, 144 nominations were presented in the first round, totaling 127 nominees. There were 17 of these, which included musicians, 21 up-and-coming artists, 15 albums, 18 radio stations and hosts, 17 music festivals, 20 music venues, and 18 music presenters.

The event also included online poll-based Hudba.sk Awards, given by the local music portal, which is part of the Slovak search engine Zoznam.sk.

Winners and nominees

Main categories

Others

Hudba.sk Awards

References

External links
 ZAI Awards > Winners (Official site)
 ZAI Awards > 2013 Nominees (at Plus 7 dní)
 ZAI Awards > 2013 Winners (by TASR)

13
2014 music awards
2014 in Slovak music